The list of Super Nintendo Entertainment System accessories encompasses first- and third-party hardware in the 1990s.

First-party accessories
 Cleaning Kit - the cleaning device that cleans the console and the gamepak.
 Super NES Controller - the console's included controller contains a four-direction D-pad, four face buttons (A, B, X, Y), two center buttons (Start and Select), and two shoulder buttons (L and R) (Nintendo)
 Super Game Boy - adapter for playing Game Boy games on the Super NES console (Nintendo)
 Super NES Mouse - two-button mouse (Nintendo)
 Super Scope - light-gun (Nintendo)
 Score Master - desktop joystick with auto-fire (Nintendo PAL)
 Satellaview (BS-X) - satellite receiver for downloading software and newsletters (Nintendo JP)
 Nintendo Power - flash-cartridge (Nintendo JP)

Third-party accessories

Controllers

Directional controllers
 Advanced Control Pad - joypad with auto-fire (Mad Catz) 
 Angler - optional "stick" in D-pad (Beeshu) 
 asciiGrip - normal joypad for single-handed use (ASCII)
 asciiPad - joypad with auto-fire and slow-motion capabilities (ASCIIWare)
 Capcom Pad Soldier - pad with pistol-grip shape and all six action buttons of the face (Capcom)
 Competition Pro - joypad with auto-fire and slow-motion (Competition Pro)
 Competition Pro - slightly redesigned standard joypad (Competition Pro)
 Conqueror 2 - joystick with auto-fire, programmable buttons (QuickShot)
 Cyberpad - 6-shaped pad, programmable, auto-fire, slow motion (Suncom)
 Dual Turbo - set of 2 wireless joypads with auto-fire (Akklaim)
 Energiser - programmable, auto fire, slow motion (Wild Things)
 Fighter Stick SN - desktop joystick, auto-fire, slow motion (ASCIIWare)
 Jet Fighter - jet fighter-shaped controller with auto-fire (Beeshu)
 Gamemaster - edgy-shaped pad, one programmable button (Triton)
 Gamepad 6 - auto-fire controller with a 6-button layout similar to a Sega Genesis controller (Performance)
 Game Commander - licensed by Nintendo (Imagineer) / Super Hori Commander - Japanese version (Hori)
 Game Commander II - licensed by Nintendo (Imagineer)
 High Frequency Control Pad - normal pad, wrong button colors (High Frequency)
 Invader 2 - joypad with auto-fire (QuickShot)
 JS-306 Power Pad Tilt - joypad with auto-fire, slow-motion, tilt-mode (Champ)
 Multisystem 6 - pad supports Genesis and Super NES (Competition Pro)
 Nigal Mouncefill Fly Wheel - wheel-shaped, tilt-sensor instead D-pad (Logic 3)
 NTT Data Pad - joypad with numeric keypad and special ID (JRA PAT)
 Pro Control 6 - programmable features, auto-fire, slow motion, L/R as face buttons, also compatible with Sega Genesis (Naki)
 Pro Fighter 6 - desktop joystick, programmable features, auto-fire, slow motion, reverse, also compatible with Sega Genesis (Naki)
 Pro Player - desktop joystick, auto-fire, slow motion, also compatible with Sega Genesis (Naki)
 Rhinogear - joypad with auto-fire and slow-motion (ASCIIWare)
 SF-3 - very flat normal pad with auto-fire (Honey Bee)
 SGB Commander - double functions for Y/X/L/R to mute sound, reduce game speed, change colors and modify the display window, L/R as face buttons, Super Game Boy/regular Super Famicom mode switch (Hori)
 SN Programpad - programmable button macros with LCD screen (InterAct)
 SN Propad - joypad with auto-fire and slow-motion (STD/InterAct)
 SN Propad 2/SN Propad 6 - joypad with auto-fire and slow-motion, L/R as face buttons (STD/InterAct)
 SN-6 - standard joypad clone (Gamester)
 Specialized Fighter Pad - auto-fire, L/R as face buttons (ASCIIWare)
 Speedpad - joypad, one auto-switch, L/R buttons as face buttons (Logic 3)
 Super Advantage - desktop joystick with auto-fire (ASCIIWare)
 Super Control Pad - standard joypad clone plus 3-position switch (?)
 Super Joy Card - standard joypad with auto-fire (Hudson Soft)
 Supercon - standard joypad, odd shape, odd start/select buttons (QuickShot)
 Superpad - standard joypad clone (InterAct)
 Superpad - standard joypad (Performance)
 Super UFO - auto-fire, extra A/B/Y/X around regular buttons, but no extra L/R, no turbo option or switch for L/R (Fire)
 TopFighter - desktop joystick, programmable, LCD panel, auto-fire, slow-motion (QJ)
 Turbo Touch 360 - joypad with auto-fire (Triax)
 V356 - normal joypad, with 3-position switch (Recoton)
 noname joypads - normal joypad clones without Nintendo text nor Super NES logo (various)
 noname joypad - wireless joypad, no extra functions and dish-shaped receiver (Konami)
 noname joypads set of 2 wireless joypads with auto-fire (Game Partner)
 noname pad - standard joypad clone (Tomee)
 AK7017828? - joypad, slow-motion, auto-fire (Game Partner)
 SNES+MD? - joypad with whatever special features (Nakitek)

Other controllers
 BatterUP - baseball bat (Sports Sciences Inc.)
 Barcode Battler - handheld gaming console (Epoch)
 Exertainment - exercise bike (Life Fitness)
 Justifier - light-gun (Konami)
 Lasabirdie - golf club (for use with Lasabirdie - Get in the Hole) (Ricoh)
 M.A.C.S. M16 - light-gun (consists of a light-pen attached to an M16 rifle, produced for C64 and SNES) (United States Army)
 Miracle Piano Teaching System - piano keyboard (The Software Toolworks)
 Nordic Quest - interactive ski-exerciser (Nordic Track)
 NTT Data Pad - joypad with additional numeric keypad (for use with Super Famicom Modem)
 Pachinko Controller - some kind of dial (Sunsoft)
 SNES Multitap - multi-tap device allowing up to four players (Hudson Soft)
 TeeV Golf - golf club (for use with various joypad-controlled golf games) (Sports Sciences Inc.)
 Twin Tap - two push-buttons (for use with the Japanese Shijou Saikyou no Quiz Ou Ketteisen Super quiz game) (Partyroom21)
 X-Band Keyboard - QWERTY keyboard for use with X-Band Modem (Catapult)

Cheat devices
 Action Replay (Datel)
 Game Genie (Codemasters)
 Game Wizard

Other devices
 Data Packs - Satellaview-style mini FLASH-cartridges that can be plugged into some game cartridges
 Multi Player Adaptors / Multitaps - adapters for multiple joypads (various manufacturers)
 Nuoptix 3D Glasses (based on Pulfrich effect) - for Jim Power: The Lost Dimension in 3-D (Loriciels)
 Power Plug - auto-fire adaptor, plugs between any joypad/joystick and Super NES console (Tyco)
 StuntMaster - headset with LCD monitor, headphones, motion-sensor (VictorMaxx/Future Vision Technologies)
 Sufami Turbo - mini-cartridge adapter (Bandai)
 NTT Data Communication Modem NDM24 - modem for JRA PAT (Japanese online horse betting)
 Super 8 / Tri-star - adapter for NES games
 Turbo File Adapter and Turbo File Twin - external storage device (ASCII)
 Voice-Kun - infrared transmitter/receiver (used for controlling Audio CD players) (Koei)
 X-Band Modem - modem for multi-player gaming (Catapult)

See also

 List of Nintendo Entertainment System accessories
 List of Super NES enhancement chips
 Nintendo 64 accessories

References

Super Nintendo Entertainment System
Super Nintendo Entertainment System